Méry-sur-Cher is a commune in the Cher department in the Centre-Val de Loire region of France.

Geography
The now disused Canal de Berry passes through the south of the commune.

Population

Sights
 The church of St. Martin, dating from the twelfth century.
 The sixteenth-century chateau of Mery.
 The seventeenth-century chateau La Foret.
 The nineteenth-century chateau Gaillard.

Personalities
Cyprian Godebski (1835–1909), sculptor and painter was born here.

See also
Communes of the Cher department

References

External links

Official commune website 

Communes of Cher (department)